Speed King can refer to the following:

"Speed King", a song by Deep Purple
"Speed King", a song by Rip Slyme
Speed King, a 1985 motorbike racing game from Mastertronic
Speed Kings, a 2003 motorbike racing game from Acclaim Entertainment
Speed Kings (film), a 1915 film featuring Oliver Hardy
The Speed Kings, a 1913 film featuring Fatty Arbuckle